Treat Huey and Dominic Inglot were the champions in 2014, when the men's event was last held, but Huey chose not to participate this year. Inglot played alongside Robin Haase, but lost in the semifinals to Rohan Bopanna and André Sá.

Bob and Mike Bryan won the title, defeating Bopanna and Sá in the final, 6–7(4–7), 6–4, [10–3].

Seeds

Draw

Draw

References
 Main draw

Aegon Internationalandnbsp;- Doubles
2017 Men's Doubles